Pierre Humbert (13 June 1891, Paris – 17 November 1953, Montpellier) was a French mathematician who worked on the theory of elliptic functions and introduced Humbert polynomials. He was the son of the mathematician Georges Humbert and  married the daughter of Henri Andoyer.

Pierre Humbert was an Invited Speaker of the ICM in 1928 in Bologna.

See also
Humbert series

Publications
Introduction à l'études des fonctions elliptiques, à l'usage des étudiants des facultés des sciences, Paris, Hermann 1922
with Henri Andoyer: Histoire de la Nation Française. Tome XIV, Histoire des Sciences en France; première partie, Histoire des Mathématiques, de la Mécanique et de l'Astronomie. Paris 1924
Calcul Symbolique, Paris, Hermann 1934
with Serge Colombo: Le calcul symbolique et ses applications à la physique mathématique, Paris, Gauthier-Villars 1949, 2nd edn. 1965
Potentiels et Prepotentiels, Gauthier-Villars 1937
Exercises numeriques d´ astronomie, Paris 1933
L´Oeuvre astronomique de Gassendi, Hermann 1936
Histoire des découvertes astronomiques, Paris 1948 (book for young people)
Pierre Duhem, Paris 1934
Philosophes et Savants, Paris, Flammarion 1953
with Serge Colombo: Introduction mathématique à l’étude des théories électromagnétiques, Gauthier-Villars 1949

References

French mathematicians
1891 births
1953 deaths